Guillermo del Castillo (born 14 December 1963 in Rosario) is a former Argentine rugby union player. He played as a fly-half.

Del Castillo played for Jockey Club de Rosario.

He had 15 caps for Argentina, from 1991 to 1995, scoring 3 conversions, 5 penalties and 1 drop goal, 24 points on aggregate. He was called for the 1991 Rugby World Cup, playing in two games and scoring 1 conversion and 2 penalties, 8 points on aggregate. He once again would be called for the 1995 Rugby World Cup but this time he didn't leave the bench.

References

External links

1963 births
Living people
Argentine rugby union players
Argentina international rugby union players
Jockey Club de Rosario players
Rugby union fly-halves
Sportspeople from Rosario, Santa Fe